The 2002–03 Xerez CD season was the club's 56th season in existence and the second consecutive season in the second division of Spanish football. In addition to the domestic league, Xerez participated in this season's edition of the Copa del Rey. The season covered the period from 1 July 2002 to 30 June 2003.

Competitions

Overview

Segunda División

League table

Results summary

Results by round

Matches

Copa del Rey

References

External links

Xerez CD seasons
Xerez